Cornelius Michael "Nick" McInerney (April 27, 1897) was an American football player who played eight seasons for the Chicago Cardinals.

References

1890s births
1984 deaths
Players of American football from Chicago
American football offensive linemen
Chicago Cardinals players